Bell is a surname common in English speaking countries with several word-origins.

The surname is derived from the Middle English bell. This surname likely originated as an occupational name for a bell ringer or bell maker; or else from a topographic name for someone who lived by an actual bell, or by a house sign or inn sign. In other cases, the surname Bell is derived from the mediaeval personal name Bel. The masculine form of this personal name is derived from the Old French beu, bel ("handsome"); the feminine form of the name represents a short form of Isobel. In some cases, the surname originates from a nickname, or descriptive name, derived from the Old French bel ("beautiful", "fair"). In some cases, the surname is derived from placenames in Norway (Bell) and Germany (Bell in Rhineland; and possibly Belle, in Westphalia). The surname Bell is also sometimes an Anglicized form of the German Böhl or Böll.

Early attested forms of the surname when of a patronymic origin include: Ailuuardus "filius Belli", in 1086; Ricardus "filius Bell", in 1279; and Osbertus "filius Belle", in 1297. Early attested forms of the surname, when originating from an occupational name include: Seaman "Belle", in 1181–1187; and Serlo "Belle", in 1190. An early attested form of the surname when originating from someone who lived near a sign of a bell is: John "atte Belle", in 1332. Early attested forms of the surname when originating from nickname include: Hugo "bel" in 1148; and Robertus "bellus", and Robert "le bel", both in 1186–1200. Today the surname Bell can be found in many parts of the world. It is the 67th most popular surname in the United States and the 36th most common surname in Scotland.

A 
 Aaron Bell (musician) (1922–2003), American musician
 Aaron Bell (politician) (born 1980), British Conservative politician
 Acton Bell, pseudonym of Anne Brontë
 Adino Nye Bell (1866–1956), American politician
 Adolphus Bell (1944–2013), American musician
 Adrian Bell (1901–1980), English journalist and farmer; father of Martin Bell
 Al Bell (born 1940), American musical artist and executive
 Alden John Bell (1904–1982), Roman Catholic bishop
 Alexander Graham Bell (1847–1922), Scottish-Canadian-American inventor, teacher, engineer, and scientist, son of Alexander Melville Bell
 Alexander Melville Bell (1819–1905), Scottish-American philologist, researcher and teacher, father of Alexander Graham Bell
 Alexandra Bell (artist) (born 1983), American artist
 Alexandra Bell (athlete) (born 1992), British middle-distance runner
 Alison Bell (disambiguation), 7 people including
 Alison Bell (actress) (born 1978), Australian actress
 Alison Bell (journalist) (born 1966), English journalist and radio presenter
 Allan Bell (born 1947), Manx politician, Chief Minister of the Isle of Man
 Allan Bell (sociolinguist) (born 1947), New Zealand sociolinguist
 Allan Gordon Bell (born 1953), Canadian contemporary classical composer
 Alphonzo E. Bell Sr. (1875–1947), American oil millionaire; father of Alphonzo E. Bell Jr.
 Alphonzo E. Bell Jr. (1914–2004), American politician
 Amanda Bell (born 1988), American Mixed Martial Artist
 Amir Bell (born 1996), American basketball player in the Israel Basketball Premier League
 Andrew Bell (disambiguation), 9 people, including:
Andrew Bell (engraver) (1726–1809), Scottish co-founder of the Encyclopædia Britannica
Andrew Bell (educationalist) (1753–1832), Scottish pioneer of mutual instruction and author of the Madras System of Education
Andrew Bell (judge) (born 1966), Australian judge
 Andy Bell (disambiguation), 9 people, including:
Andy Bell (freestyle motocross rider) (born 1975), freestyle motocross rider
Andy Bell (musician) (born 1970), guitarist with Ride, Hurricane #1 and bassist with Oasis
Andy Bell (singer) (born 1964), singer with synth pop band Erasure
 Angellica Bell (born 1976), English television and radio presenter
 Anthea Bell (1936–2018), English translator of literary works including Asterix
 Anthony Bell (born 1964), Retired American gridiron football player
 Anthony Bell (director) (born 1970), American animator, film director and screenwriter
 Aran Bell (born 1998) American ballet dancer
 Archie Bell (singer) (born 1944), American musician
 Arthur Bell (disambiguation), 11 people, including:
Art Bell (1945–2018), American broadcaster and author
Arthur Hornbui Bell (1891–1973), Grand Dragon of the Ku Klux Klan in New Jersey
Arthur Bell (engineer) (1856–1943), New Zealand engineer
Arthur Bell (journalist) (1939-1984), American journalist, author and LGBT rights activist

See also 

 Alexandra Bell (disambiguation) (2 people)

B
 Beau Bell (1907–1977), American baseball player
 Beau Bell (American football), (born 1986), American gridiron football player
 Ben Bell, New Zealand politician
 Benny Bell (1906–1999), American singer-songwriter
 Bert Bell (1895–1959), American football player, coach, and executive
 Billy Bell (disambiguation), 15 people including:
 Bill Bell (mayor) (born 1941), American politician
 Bill Bell (American football) (1947–2022), American gridiron football player
 Bill Bell (businessman) (1932–2013), English football chairman
 Billy Bell (ice hockey) (1891–1952), Canadian ice hockey player
 Billy Bell (politician) (1935–2020), British politician
 Bob Bell (disambiguation), multiple people
 Bobby Bell (born 1940), American footballer
 Bradley Bell (born 1964), American television writer and producer
 Brenda Bell (1891–1979), pioneer amateur radio operator from New Zealand
 Brendan Bell (disambiguation), multiple people, including:
Brendan Bell (ice hockey) (born 1983), Canadian ice hockey defenceman
Brendan Bell (politician) (born 1971), Canadian territorial level politician and former cabinet minister
Brendan Bell (footballer) (1910–?), Scottish footballer
 Brian Bell (disambiguation), multiple people, including:
Brian Bell (born 1968), American musician
Brian Bell (American football) (born 1984), American football fullback
Brian Bell (basketball) (born 1989), American wheelchair basketball player
Brian Bell (businessman) (1928–2010), Australian-born businessman in Papua New Guinea
Brian Douglas Bell (1930–2016), New Zealand ornithologist
Brian Murray (actor) (1937–2018), South African actor born Brian Bell
 Buddy Bell (born 1951), American baseball player
 Burton C. Bell (born 1969), American rock singer

See also 

 Beau Bell (disambiguation)

C
 Cammy Bell (born 1986), Scottish international football goalkeeper
 Carey Bell (1936–2007), American blues harpist
 Caroline M. Bell (1874–1970), American artist
 Catherine Bell (actress) (born 1968), British-American actress
 Catherine J. Bell (born 1954), Canadian politician
 Charles Bell (1774–1842), Scottish surgeon
 Charles Bell (disambiguation), multiple people, including:
Charles Bell (surveyor) (1813–1882), Scottish surveyor, general, artist, and designer
Charles Bell (painter), (1935–1995), American Photorealist who created large scale still lifes.
Charles H. Bell (politician) (1823–1893), American politician 
Charles H. Bell (naval officer) (1798–1875), United States naval officer
Charlie Bell (baseball) (1868–1937), Major League Baseball pitcher
Charlie Bell (businessman) ( – 2005), Australian businessman
Charlie Bell (basketball) (born 1979), United States basketball player
 Chichester A. Bell, American sound engineer
 Chris Bell (disambiguation), multiple people, including:
Chris Bell (American musician) (1951–1978), American musician
Chris Bell (director) (born 1972), American director, producer and writer
Chris Bell (politician) (born 1959), American politician
Christopher Bell (racing driver) (born 1994), American racing driver
 Clive Bell (1881–1964), British art critic and philosopher
 Coby Bell (born 1975), American actor and producer
 Colin Bell, multiple people
 Cool Papa Bell, American baseball player
 Currer Bell, pseudonym of Charlotte Brontë

D
 Daniel Bell (1919–2011), American sociologist
 Danna C. Bell, American archivist and librarian
 D'Anthony Bell (born 1996), American football player
 David Bell (disambiguation), multiple people, including:
David Bell (baseball) (born 1972), American baseball player
David Bell (basketball) (born 1981), American basketball player
David Bell (television) (1936–1990), Scottish TV producer and director
David Bell (field hockey player), Australian field hockey player
David Bell (footballer, born 1984) (born 1984), English-born Irish footballer
David Bell (footballer, born 1985) (born 1985), Irish footballer
David Bell (VC), Irish soldier
David Robert Bell (born 1959), Vice-Chancellor of the University of Reading
 Dean Bell (born 1962), New Zealand rugby league footballer and coach
 Demetress Bell (born 1984), American football offensive tackle
 Dennis Bell (disambiguation), multiple people, including:
Dennis Bell (Medal of Honor recipient) (1866–1953), Buffalo Soldier of the Spanish–American War
Dennis Bell (basketball) (born 1951), American basketball player
 Derek Bell (disambiguation), multiple people, including:
Derek Bell (musician) (1935–2002), harpist
Derek Bell (auto racer) (born 1941), British racing driver
Derek Bell (baseball player) (born 1968), American baseball player
 Derrick Bell, American law professor
 Diane Bell (disambiguation), multiple people
 Dillon Bell (1822–1898), New Zealand politician
 Don Bell (disambiguation), multiple people
 Doug Bell (game designer) (born 1961), American computer game developer
 Drake Bell (born 1986), American actor and guitarist
 Drew Tyler Bell (born 1986), American actor and performer
 Duncan Bell, English rugby union player
 Duncan Bell (actor), Scottish actor

E
 Earl Bell (born 1955), American pole vaulter
 Edith Anna Bell (1870–1929) Irish sculptor
 Edward Bell (disambiguation), multiple people
 Edmond Bell, English MP
 Eileen Bell (born 1943), Northern Ireland politician
 Eileen Bell (artist) (1907–2005), British artist
 Elizabeth Bell (disambiguation), multiple people, including:
Elizabeth Bell (doctor) (1869–1934), Ireland's first woman doctor
Elizabeth Bell (actress) (1941–2012), British actress who played stage and screen
Elizabeth Bell (composer) (1928–2016), founder of the New York Women Composers, Inc.
 Ellis Bell, pseudonym of Emily Brontë
 Emily Bell (born 1965), British journalist
 Emma Bell (born 1986), American actress
 Eric Temple Bell (1883–1960), American mathematician
 Ernest Bell (animal rights activist) (1851–1933), British author, animal rights activist, humanitarian, and vegetarian
 Ernest Bell (footballer), English footballer

F
 Francis Bell (disambiguation), multiple people, including:
Francis Bell (actor) (1944–1994), UK-born New Zealand actor
Francis Bell (New Zealand politician) (1851–1936), Prime Minister of New Zealand
Francis Bell (engineer) (1813–1879), British railway engineer
Francis Campbell Bell (1892–1968), politician in Manitoba, Canada
 Frank Bell, multiple people, including:
Frank Bell (baseball) (1863–1891), Major League Baseball player
Frank T. Bell (1883–1970), U.S. Commissioner of Fish and Fisheries (1933–1939)
 Frederick William Bell (1875–1954), Australian soldier

G
 Gary Bell (baseball) (born 1936), American Major League Baseball pitcher
 Gary Bell (footballer) (born 1947), English (soccer) footballer
 Geoff Bell (disambiguation), multiple people, including:
Geoff Bell (rugby league), Australian rugby league footballer
Geoff Bell (actor) (born 1963), British actor
 Geoffrey Bell (born 1939), economist, banker
 Geoffrey Bell (cricketer) (1896–1984), English cricketer and educationalist
 George Bell (disambiguation), one of several people including
 George Bell (Australian politician) (1872–1944), Australian politician
 George Bell (pitcher) (1874–1941), American baseball player
 George Bell (painter) (1878–1966), Australian painter
 George Bell (bishop) (1883–1958), Anglican bishop of Chichester
 George Irving Bell (1926–2000), American physicist and mountain climber
 George Bell (outfielder) (born 1959), Dominican baseball player
 Gertrude Bell (1868–1926), British archaeologist, writer & spy
 Gladys Kathleen Bell (1882–1965), English painter
 Glen Bell, American founder of Taco Bell restaurant chain
 Gordon Bell (disambiguation), multiple people, including:
 Gordon Bell (born 1934), computer engineer
 Gordon Bell (artist), British comic strip artist
 Gordon Bell (QNX), Canadian computer scientist
 Gordon Bell (ice hockey), ice hockey player
 Graeme Bell (1914–2012), Australian pianist, composer and band leader
 Graham Bell (disambiguation), multiple people, including:
Graham Bell (advocate), Scottish advocate
Graham E. Bell, astronomer
Graham J. Bell, English FA accredited referee and radio personality
Graham Bell (artist) (1910–1943), painter
Graham Bell (biologist) (born 1949), English academic, writer and evolutionary biologist
Graham Bell (footballer) (born 1955), English footballer
Graham Bell (singer) (1948–2008), English pop and rock singer
Graham Bell (skier) (born 1966), Olympic skier
 Grant Bell, Australian rugby league coach
 Griffin Bell (1918–2009), American politician
 Gus Bell (1928–1995), American Baseball player

H
 Harriet Bell (1923–1995), American advocate for disability rights 
Hazel K. Bell, English indexer and writer 
 Heath Bell (born 1977), American baseball player
 Helen Bell, English folk musician
 Henri Lobe Bell, Duala ruler in Cameroon
 Henry Bell (disambiguation), multiple people, including:
Henry Bell (engineer) (1767–1830), Scottish engineer
Henry Glassford Bell (1803–1874), Scottish lawyer, poet and historian
Henry H. Bell (1808–1868), American sailor
Henry Lawrie Bell (1929–1984), Australian ornithologist
 Hi Bell (1897–1949), professional baseball player
 Hilari Bell (born 1958), American fantasy writer
Hilary Bell (swimmer) (born 1991), swimmer from Canada
Hilary Bell (writer) (born 1966), Australian writer
Hilary Bell (television producer) (1965–2010),  reality television pioneer
 Hugh Bell (disambiguation)
 Hunter Bell, American book author

I
 Ian Bell (disambiguation), multiple people, including:
Ian Bell (journalist) (1956–2015), Scottish journalist and writer
Ian Bell (literaturist) (born 1947), professor of American literature at Keele University
Ian Bell (musician) (born 1954), Canadian musician
Ian Bell (programmer) (born 1962), British computer programmer
 Isaac Lowthian Bell, British industrialist

J
 J. Ernest Bell II (born 1941), American politician and lawyer
 J. Franklin Bell (1856–1919),  U.S. Army Chief of Staff (1906–1910)
 Jack Bell (disambiguation), multiple people, including:
Jack Bell (footballer, born 1869), footballer with Everton F.C.
 Jacob Bell (disambiguation), multiple people
 James Franklin Bell, US Army Major General, Medal Of Honor recipient, US Army Chief of Staff
 James Spencer-Bell (1818–1872), British politician
 Jamie Bell (born 1986), British actor
 James Bell (basketball) (born 1992), Basketball Player
 Jane Bell (1910–1998), Canadian track and field athlete who competed mainly in the 100 metres
 Jay Bell (born 1965), American baseball player
 Jeanne Bell (1888–1978), British artist
 Jeff Bell (disambiguation), multiple people
 Jocelyn Bell Burnell (born 1943), British astronomer
 Joel Bell (born 1985), professional Canadian football player
 Johann Adam Schall von Bell, German Jesuit missionary
 John Bell (disambiguation), multiple people, including:
John Bell (Bishop of Worcester) (died 1556), English clergyman
John Bell (New Hampshire) (1765–1836), American politician, Governor of New Hampshire
John Bell (Tennessee politician) (1797–1869), American politician from Tennessee
John Bell (explorer) (1799–1868), Canadian explorer and governor
John Bell (Australian actor), Australian Shakespearean actor
John Joy Bell (1871–1934), Scottish author
John L. Bell, Scottish religious figure
John Lane Bell, Canadian philosopher and mathematician
John Stewart Bell (1928–1990), British physicist originated Bell's Theorem
John Thomas Bell (1878–1965), British businessman, founder of Bellway home builders
John Bell (surgeon) (1763–1820), brother of Charles Bell (anatomist)
John Bell (British Army officer), Lieutenant Governor of Guernsey 1848–1854
John William Bell (1838–1901), Canadian political figure
John Bell (musician), American guitarist and singer
John Bell (farmer) from The Bell Witch legend
John Graham Bell (1812–1899), American taxidermist
John Howatt Bell (1846–1929), Prince Edward Island politician
John Irving Bell (born 1952), British–Canadian biologist
 Joique Bell (born 1986), American football player
 Jonny Bell (rugby union), rugby union player
 Joseph-Antoine Bell (born 1954), Cameroonian international football goalkeeper
 Joseph Bell (1837–1911), Scottish physician, pioneer of forensic diagnostics, inspiration for Sherlock Holmes
 Josh Bell (disambiguation), several people
 Joshua Bell (born 1967), American musician
 Joshua Peter Bell (1827–1881), Queensland Parliamentarian
 Julia Bell (1879–1979), British geneticist
 Julian Bell (1908–1937), English poet
 Julie Bell (born 1958), American painter
 Justin Bell (born 1968), British racecar driver, son of Derek Bell

K
 Kahlil Bell (born 1986), American football player
 Kathleen Bell, American physician and professor
 Katie Bell (Harry Potter), Harry Potter character 
 Kay Bell (1914–1994), American football player and professional wrestler
 Keith Bell (rugby league, born 1934), rugby league footballer of the 1950s for New Zealand, Auckland, and Ponsonby
 Keith Bell (rugby league, born 1953), English rugby league footballer of the 1970s, 1980s and 1990s
 Keith Bell (rugby union) (born 1948), rugby union player who represented Australia
 Kendrell Bell (born 1980), American football linebacker
 Kenneth B. Bell, American judge
 Kenny Bell (born 1992), American football player
 Kerwin Bell (born 1965), American college and professional football player
 Kierstan Bell (born 2000), American basketball player
 Kristen Bell (born 1980), American actress
 Kristine Bell, American engineer

L
 Lake Bell (born 1979), American actress
 Larry Bell (disambiguation), multiple people, including:
Larry Bell (artist) (born 1939), contemporary artist based in Los Angeles, California and Taos, New Mexico
Larry M. Bell, Democratic member of the North Carolina General Assembly
Larry Gene Bell (1949–1996), double murderer in Lexington County, South Carolina
 Laura Bell (disambiguation), multiple people, including:
Laura Bell (courtesan), courtesan of Victorian England
Laura Anning Bell (1867–1950), British artist
Laura Bell (author) (21st century), American author
Laura Bell Bundy (born 1981), American actress
Laura Joyce Bell (1854–1904), English-American actress
 Lauralee Bell (born 1968), actress
 Lauren Bell (born 1999), Scottish cyclist
 Lauren Bell (cricketer) (born 2001), English cricketer
 Lawrence Dale Bell (1894–1956), American aviation pioneer
 Lee Phillip Bell, talk show host and soap opera creator
 Les Bell (1901–1985), professional baseball player
 Le'Veon Bell (born 1992), American football player
 Lilian Bell (1867–1929); pen name, "Mrs. Arthur Hoyt Bogue", American novelist, travel writer
 Louis Bell (born 1982), American music producer
 Louis Bell (engineer) (1864–1923), American engineer, physicist, and academic

M
 Mabel Bell (1857–1923), wife of inventor Alexander Graham Bell
 Madeline Bell (born 1942), American soul singer
 Madison Smartt Bell (born 1957), American author
 Maggie Bell (born 1945), British singer
 Malcolm Bell (cricketer) (born 1969), English cricketer
 Malcolm Bell (entrepreneur) (born 1981), British businessman
 Manga Ndumbe Bell (1838–1898), Duala ruler in Cameroon
 Marc Bell (disambiguation), multiple people, including:
Marc Bell (cartoonist) (born 1971), Canadian cartoonist
Marc Bell (drummer) (born 1956), American drummer for The Ramones and The Voidoids
Marc Bell (entrepreneur), American managing partner of Marc Bell Capital
 Maria Arena Bell (born 1963), American novelist, television and freelance writer
 Marie Bell (1900–1985), French tragedian, comic actor and stage director
 Marie Bell (educationalist) (1922–2012), New Zealand educationalist, lecturer and teacher
 Marilyn Bell (born 1937), swimmer
 Marjorie Bell (1906–2001), British electrical engineer and factory inspector
 Mark Bell (disambiguation), multiple people
 Markquese Bell (born 1999), American football player
 Marshall Bell (born 1942), American actor
 Martin Bell (disambiguation), multiple people, including:
Martin Bell (born 1938), British journalist and broadcaster
Martin Bell (skier) (born 1964), British skier
Martin Bell (poet) (1918–1978), British poet
 Martyn Bell (born 1964), British racing driver
 Marvin Bell (1937–2020), American poet
 Mary Bell (born 1957), British killer child
 Matthew Bell (disambiguation), multiple people
 Matty Bell (1899–1983), American football player and coach
 Melissa Bell (disambiguation), multiple people, including:
Melissa Bell (singer) (1964–2017), British singer
Melissa Bell (actor) (born 1972), Australian soap opera actress
 Michael Bell (disambiguation), multiple people
 Montgomery Bell (1769–1855), Tennessee manufacturing entrepreneur
 Morley Bell (1894–1976), Canadian lawyer and politician

N
 Ndumbe Lobe Bell, Duala ruler in Cameroon
 Neil Bell (disambiguation), multiple people, including:
Neil Bell (actor) (born 1970), British actor
Neil Bell (politician) (born 1947), Northern Territory politician
Neil Bell, pseudonym of Stephen Southwold (1887–1964), British writer
 Nicholas Bell, Australian-based British actor
 Nicole Ann Bell (known professionally as Nicole Dollanganger) (born 1991), Canadian singer-songwriter
 Noreen Bell, fictional character from British TV series Emmerdale
 Norris Garrett Bell (1860–1937), Australian railway engineer

O
 O'Neil Bell (1974–2015), Jamaican professional boxer

P
 Pat Bell, Canadian politician
 Pedro Bell, American artist and illustrator
 Peter Bell (disambiguation), multiple people, including:
Peter Hansbrough Bell (1849–1853), Inspector-General of the Army of Texas, 3rd Governor of Texas, US Congressman
Peter F. Bell born 1976, Australian rules footballer
Peter R. Bell, born 1954, Australian rules footballer
 Philip W. Bell (1924–1990), American accounting scholar

Q
 Quentin Bell (1910–1996), English art historian and author
 Quinton Bell (born 1996), American football player

R
 Raja Bell (born 1976), American basketball player
 Regla Bell (born 1970), Cuban volleyball player
 Richard Bell (disambiguation), multiple people, including:
Richard Bell (director), Canadian writer and director
Richard Bell (British politician) (1859–1930) one of the first two British Labour Members of Parliament
Richard Bell (bishop), Bishop of Carlisle from 1477 to 1495
Richard Bell (Canadian musician), member of The Band
 Ricky Bell (disambiguation), multiple people, including:
Ricky Bell (running back), National Football League running back
Ricky Bell (cornerback), National Football League cornerback
 Rita Bell (1893-1992), American singer, entertainer
 Robert Bell (disambiguation), multiple people, including:
Robert Bell (speaker) (died 1577), British judge & politician
Robert D. Bell (born 1967), American jurist, judge on the Oklahoma Court of Civil Appeals
Robert E. Bell, American archaeologist
Robert M. Bell (born 1943), American jurist
Robert "Kool" Bell (born 1950), American singer, songwriter and bassist
Robert Bell (writer) (1800–1867), Irish man of letters
 Ronald Bell (disambiguation), multiple people, including:
Ronald Bell (cricketer) (1931–1989), Middlesex and Sussex cricketer
Ronald Bell (politician) (1914–1982), Conservative Member of Parliament 1945 and 1950–1982
Ronald Bell (musician) (1951–2020), American singer-songwriter, member of Kool & the Gang
Ronald D. Bell, Justice of the Tax Court of Canada
 Ronnie Bell British chemist at Oxford University
 Ronnie Bell (American football) (born 2000), American football player
 Ross Bell (1929–2019), American entomologist
 Roy Bell (disambiguation), multiple people, including:
Roy Bell (Canadian football) (born 1949), Canadian footballer
Roy Bell (ornithologist) (1882–1966), New Zealand and Australian ornithologist
Roy Bell (rugby league) (born 1984), Australian rugby league player
 Rudolf Duala Manga Bell (1873–1914), Duala ruler in Cameroon
 Ryan Bell (disambiguation), multiple people.
 Ryan J. Bell (born 1971), Seventh-day Adventist Pastor, later an Atheist activist.

S
 Sam Bell (footballer, born 1909) (1909–1982), English professional footballer
 Sam H. Bell (1925–2010), American jurist – Ohio
 Sam Hanna Bell (1909–1990), Northern Irish novelist, short story writer, playwright, and broadcaster
 Samuel Bell (disambiguation), multiple people, including:
Samuel Bell (1770–1850), American jurist & politician – New Hampshire
Samuel Bell (California politician) (fl. 1850s), American politician
Samuel Dana Bell (1798–1868), Chief justice of New Hampshire state supreme court
Samuel Newell Bell (1829–1889), US Congressman from New Hampshire
 Sandy Bell (1906–1985), South African Test cricketer
 Sean Bell (1984–2006), African American shot by New York City police
 Shannon Bell (born 1955), Canadian philosopher and feminist
 Shona M. Bell (1924–2011), New Zealand palaeontologist
 Stefan Bell (born 1991), German footballer with 1. FSV Mainz 05 in the Bundesliga
 Stephen Bell (1965–2001), English footballer
 Steve Bell (disambiguation), multiple people, including:
Steve Bell (news anchor) (1935–2019), first anchor of the ABC News program World News This Morning, previously reporter for WOWT-TV
Steve Bell (cartoonist) (born 1951), English cartoonist
Steve Bell (musician) (born 1960), Canadian musician
Steve Bell (soccer) (born 1975), retired American soccer midfielder
 Steven Bell (born 1976), Australian rugby league player
 Stuart Bell (1938–2012), British Labour Party politician
 Stuart R. Bell, American academic, President of the University of Alabama

T
 Tatum Bell (born 1981), American football running back
 Terrel Bell (1921–1996), American Secretary of Education
 Terrell Bell (born 1973), American basketball player
 Terry Bell (disambiguation), several people
 Theo Bell (1953–2006), American football wide receiver
 Thom Bell (1943-2022), Jamaican-American music producer
 Thomas Bell (disambiguation), multiple people, including:
Thomas Bell (zoologist), English zoologist, surgeon, and writer
Thomas Cowan Bell, one of the seven founders of Sigma Chi Fraternity
Thomas M. Bell (Ohio politician)
Thomas Reid Davys Bell, Irish lepidopterist
 Tim Bell, British public relations and political adviser
 Tina Bell (1957–2012), American singer
 Tobin Bell, American actor
 Tom Bell (Australian footballer) (born 1991), Australian rules footballer
 Townsend Bell (born 1975), motor racing driver, married to actress Heather Campbell
 Trevor Bell (disambiguation), multiple people, including:
Trevor Bell (artist) (1930–2017), English painter
Trevor Bell (baseball) (born 1986), American baseball pitcher
 Troy Bell (born 1980), American professional basketball player

V
Van D. Bell (1918–2009), American Marine officer, recipient of two Navy Crosses
Vanessa Bell (1879–1961), British painter
 Vera Bell (1906-?), Jamaican writer
 Vereen Bell, American writer
 Vernon Bell, founder of the British karate movement
 Vinnie Bell (1932–2019), born Vincent Gambella, American session guitarist
 Viola Bell (1897–1990), New Zealand community leader
 Virginia Bell (actress), American model and actress

W
 Wade Bell (born 1945), American middle-distance runner
 Wally Bell (1965–2013), American baseball umpire
 W. Kamau Bell, American stand-up comic
 W. D. M. Bell (1880–1954), Scottish-born elephant hunter
 Wayne Bell (computer specialist), bulletin board pioneer
 William Bell (disambiguation), multiple people, including:
 William Dwane Bell, New Zealander convicted for a triple murder
 William E. Bell (author) (fl. 2000s), Canadian writer
 William Henry Bell (1873–1946), English born composer, later South African Professor of Music
 William J. Bell (1927–2005), TV producer
 William Nathaniel Bell (1817–1887), American settler

Y
 Yeremiah Bell (born 1978), American football safety for the Miami Dolphins of the National Football League

See also
 Bell (disambiguation)

Notes

References

Americanized surnames
English-language surnames
Scottish surnames